The Walter Payton Award is awarded annually to the most outstanding offensive player in the NCAA Division I Football Championship Subdivision (formerly Division I-AA) of college football as chosen by a nationwide panel of media and college sports information directors. The honor was first given  in 1987 to the outstanding player in the division, but in 1995, eligibility was restricted to offensive players, as the Buck Buchanan Award for defensive players was inaugurated.

The award was named in honor of the late National Football League (NFL) legend Walter Payton, who starred at Jackson State University in the early 1970s.

The most recent winner of the award is Lindsey Scott Jr., a quarterback from Incarnate Word who earned the honor during the 2022 season.

Winners

Awards won by school 
This is a list of the colleges and universities who have had a player win a Walter Payton Award. Among the many schools in the division, only nine have claimed more than one award, and only seven have had more than one player win the award. Eastern Washington has had four players win the award, Villanova has had three players win the award, and five have had two players win: Colgate, Georgia Southern, Idaho, New Hampshire, and Eastern Illinois. Two players have won the award twice, with both being the only players from their institutions to win. In 2009, Armanti Edwards from Appalachian State became the first to receive the award twice, followed in 2017 by Jeremiah Briscoe from Sam Houston State. In 2019, Trey Lance of North Dakota State was the first freshman to receive the award.

^ Team is now a member of the Football Bowl Subdivision (FBS).

References

College football national player awards
Awards established in 1987
Walter Payton